Niethammeriodes is a genus of moths of the family Pyralidae. The genus name is in honor of Günther Niethammer.

Species
Niethammeriodes diremptella (Ragonot, 1887)
Niethammeriodes ustella (Ragonot, 1887)

References

Phycitini
Pyralidae genera